Ulesie may refer to the following places in Poland:
Ulesie, Lower Silesian Voivodeship (south-west Poland)
Ulesie, Silesian Voivodeship (south Poland)
Ulesie, Warmian-Masurian Voivodeship (north Poland)